Aaron Reardon may refer to:
 Aaron Reardon (politician)
 Aaron Reardon (soccer)